Petteri Antti Nokelainen (born January 16, 1986) is a Finnish former professional ice hockey forward who played over 200 games in the National Hockey League (NHL). He concluded his professional career in returning to his original club, SaiPa of the Finnish Liiga.

Playing career
Nokelainen was drafted by the New York Islanders as their first-round pick, 16th overall, in the 2004 NHL Entry Draft. He played in the SM-Liiga for SaiPa in his native Finland, before going to North America in 2005 to play for the New York Islanders. Prior to Saipa, he played in Imatran Ketterä.

Twelve games into the 2005–06 NHL season with the Islanders, during which he scored a goal and an assist, Petteri suffered a severe knee injury. Many thought that this injury would sideline him for the rest of the year, but the knee healed without surgery and Nokelainen returned to finish the rest of the season with the Islanders. His knee still required surgery, which he had performed after the season.

On September 11, 2007, Nokelainen was traded to Boston for Ben Walter and a conditional second round draft pick. On March 4, 2009, Nokelainen was traded by the Bruins to the Anaheim Ducks for Steve Montador.

On March 3, 2010, Nokelainen was traded to the Phoenix Coyotes in exchange for a sixth round pick in the 2011 NHL Entry Draft. Helping the Coyotes qualify for the playoffs for the first time in 7 seasons, Petteri went scoreless in five postseason games against the Detroit Red Wings. On July 1, 2010, Nokelainen was bought out from the remaining year of his contract by the Coyotes, releasing him as a free agent. Later that summer, Nokelainen signed a two-year contract with Jokerit of the SM-liiga. Nokelainen's season ended with a trophy, as Finland won the 2011 IIHF World Championship in Slovakia with Nokelainen scoring the game-winning goal in the final against Sweden.

After one season with Jokerit, Nokelainen returned to the Phoenix Coyotes, signing a one-year contract on May 20, 2011.

On October 23, 2011, the Montreal Canadiens acquired Nokelainen and defenceman Garrett Stafford from the Phoenix Coyotes in exchange for forward Brock Trotter and a seventh-round pick in the 2012 NHL Entry Draft.

On August 16, 2013, Nokelainen returned to Europe as a free agent and signed a one-year contract with Swedish club, Brynäs IF of the Swedish Hockey League (SHL).

Career statistics

Regular season and playoffs

International

References

External links

1986 births
Living people
Anaheim Ducks players
Boston Bruins players
Bridgeport Sound Tigers players
Brynäs IF players
Finnish ice hockey centres
Hamilton Bulldogs (AHL) players
Jokerit players
Montreal Canadiens players
New York Islanders draft picks
New York Islanders players
National Hockey League first-round draft picks
People from Imatra
Phoenix Coyotes players
Providence Bruins players
SaiPa players
Torpedo Nizhny Novgorod players
Sportspeople from South Karelia